Altay Özurgancı (born 11 May 1988) is a Turkish professional basketball player. After a small break in his career he went to Australia where he was studying business and in the same time keeping his professional career. He got married in 2017 and rumors say that he is living in France...

External links
Profile at tblstat.net
Profile at galatasaray.org

1988 births
Living people
Galatasaray S.K. (men's basketball) players
Turkish men's basketball players
Small forwards